This article describes the history of South African cricket from the 2000–01 season. Noted South African players in the 21st century have included Jacques Kallis, Shaun Pollock, Makhaya Ntini, Mark Boucher, Graeme Smith and Herschelle Gibbs.

Domestic cricket
In 2004–05 the SuperSport Series national championship was subject to a complete review designed to rebrand it and re-establish its popularity.  Six new franchises were introduced to create a stronger top-tier of sides underpinned by a second-tier tournament that was based around the old provincial teams, who play in a provincial championship that is currently (2007–08) called the South African Airways Provincial Three-Day Challenge.

The rebranded SuperSport Series teams are:
 Cape Cobras in Cape Town and Paarl
 Dolphins in Durban
 Eagles in Bloemfontein
 Lions in Johannesburg and Potchefstroom
 Titans in Centurion, Gauteng and Benoni
 Warriors in Port Elizabeth and East London

SuperSport Series from 2000–01
 2000–01 Western Province 
 2001–02 KwaZulu-Natal 
 2002–03 Easterns
 2003–04 Western Province

the competition was rebranded in 2004 with the introduction of franchise teams
 2004–05 Eagles and Dolphins shared 
 2005–06 Dolphins and Titans shared 
 2006–07 Titans
 2007–08 Eagles
 2008–09 Titans
 2009–10 Cape Cobras
 2010–11

MTN Championship / Standard Bank Cup winners
 2000–01 KwaZulu Natal
 2001–02 KwaZulu Natal
 2002–03 Western Province
 2003–04 Gauteng
 2004–05 Eagles
 2005–06 Eagles
 2006–07 Cape Cobras
 2007–08 Titans
 2008–09 Titans
 2009–10 Warriors
 2010–11

Pro20 Series (Twenty20) winners
 2003–04 Eagles
 2004–05 Titans
 2005–06 Eagles
 2006–07 Lions
 2007–08 Titans
 2008–09 Cape Cobras
 2009–10 Warriors
 2010–11

Provincial Three-Day Challenge winners
This is a first-class championship for the provincial teams and so is effectively the descendant of the old Currie Cup.

It was called the UCB Provincial Cup in 2004–05 and then its name was changed to South African Airways Provincial Three-Day Challenge. Winners have been:
 2004–05 Griqualand West; runners up Border
 2005–06 Northerns; runners-up Western Province
 2006–07 Gauteng; runners-up Easterns
 2007–08 Griqualand West; runners up Western Province
 2008–09 Griqualand West; runners up North West
 2009–10 Easterns; runners up Gauteng
 2010–11

International tours

2000–01, New Zealand

 1st Test at Goodyear Park, Bloemfontein – South Africa won by 5 wickets
 2nd Test at St George's Park, Port Elizabeth – South Africa won by 7 wickets
 3rd Test at New Wanderers Stadium, Johannesburg – match drawn

2000–01, Sri Lanka

2001–02, India

 1st Test at Goodyear Park, Bloemfontein – South Africa won by 9 wickets
 2nd Test at St George's Park, Port Elizabeth – match drawn

2001–02, Australia

 1st Test at New Wanderers Stadium, Johannesburg – Australia won by an innings and 360 runs
 2nd Test at Newlands Cricket Ground, Cape Town – Australia won by 4 wickets
 3rd Test at Kingsmead, Durban – South Africa won by 5 wickets

2001–02, Kenya

2002–03, Bangladesh

 1st Test at Buffalo Park, East London – South Africa won by an innings and 107 runs
 2nd Test at North West Cricket Stadium, Potchefstroom – South Africa won by an innings and 160 runs

2002–03, Sri Lanka

2002–03, Pakistan

 1st Test at Kingsmead, Durban – South Africa won by 10 wickets
 2nd Test at Newlands Cricket Ground, Cape Town – South Africa won by an innings and 142 runs

2003–04, West Indies

 1st Test at New Wanderers Stadium, Johannesburg – South Africa won by 189 runs
 2nd Test at Kingsmead, Durban – South Africa won by an innings and 65 runs
 3rd Test at Newlands Cricket Ground, Cape Town – match drawn
 4th Test at Centurion Park – South Africa won by 10 wickets

2004–05, England

 1st Test at St George's Park, Port Elizabeth – England won by 7 wickets
 2nd Test at Kingsmead, Durban – match drawn
 3rd Test at Newlands Cricket Ground, Cape Town – South Africa won by 196 runs
 4th Test at New Wanderers Stadium, Johannesburg – England won by 77 runs
 5th Test at Centurion Park – match drawn

2004–05, Zimbabwe

 1st Test at Newlands Cricket Ground, Cape Town – South Africa won by an innings and 21 runs
 2nd Test at Centurion Park – South Africa won by an innings and 62 runs

2005–06, Australia

 1st Test at Newlands Cricket Ground, Cape Town – Australia won by 7 wickets
 2nd Test at Kingsmead, Durban – Australia won by 112 runs
 3rd Test at New Wanderers Stadium, Johannesburg – Australia won by 2 wickets

For details of the famous high-scoring LOI, see : Australia in South Africa, 5th ODI, 2006

2005–06, New Zealand

 1st Test at Centurion Park – South Africa won by 128 runs
 2nd Test at Newlands Cricket Ground, Cape Town – match drawn
 3rd Test at New Wanderers Stadium, Johannesburg – South Africa won by 4 wickets

2006–07, India

 1st Test at New Wanderers Stadium, Johannesburg – India won by 123 runs
 2nd Test at Kingsmead, Durban – South Africa won by 174 runs
 3rd Test at Newlands Cricket Ground, Cape Town – South Africa won by 5 wickets

2006–07, Pakistan

 1st Test at Centurion Park – South Africa won by 7 wickets
 2nd Test at St George's Park, Port Elizabeth – Pakistan won by 5 wickets
 3rd Test at Newlands Cricket Ground, Cape Town – South Africa won by 5 wickets

2006–07, Zimbabwe

2007–08, New Zealand

2007–08, West Indies

2008–09, Australia

2008–09, Bangladesh

2008–09, Kenya

2009–10, England

2009–10, Zimbabwe

2010–11, India

2010–11, Zimbabwe

References

External sources
 CricketArchive – the itinerary of South African cricket

Bibliography
 South African Cricket Annual – various editions
 Wisden Cricketers' Almanack – 1864 to present (best for reviews from 2001 season)

 History of South African cricket
 South African cricket in the 21st century
 South African cricket seasons from 2000–01